Karashima (written: 辛島) is a Japanese surname. Notable people with the surname include:

 (born 1971), Japanese footballer and manager
 (born 1933), Japanese historian, writer, and academic

Japanese-language surnames